Ye Zhanggen (born 7 May 1984) is a former Chinese footballer.

Career statistics

Club

Notes

References

1984 births
Living people
Chinese footballers
Association football midfielders
Chinese Super League players
Beijing Renhe F.C. players
Shanghai Shenxin F.C. players